Pakuh may refer to:
 Pakuh, Isfahan
 Pakuh, Kohgiluyeh and Boyer-Ahmad
 Pakuh-e Sefid